Tubariella is a genus of fungi in the Bolbitiaceae family of mushrooms. This is a monotypic genus, containing the single species Tubariella rhizophora, found growing on rotten wood in Papua New Guinea.

References

External links
 Tubariella at Index Fungorum

Bolbitiaceae
Monotypic Agaricales genera